The All Star Talent Show is a 2006 UK television programme that was broadcast on Five. It was presented by Andi Peters and Myleene Klass, with Julian Clary making up the judging panel alongside two guest judges. Each show had six celebrities performing, with the winner of each episode going into the final at the end of the series. In addition, the runner up with the most votes at the end of the series also performed again in the final. Backing vocals on the show were directed and sung by Tracy Graham and Tara McDonald.

Episodes

Week 1 (8 September) 

The two guest judges on this episode were Jo Brand and Kerry Katona. The winner of this heat was Carol Thatcher. Juliette Foster was the highest scoring runner up in the whole series and so made it into the final as well.

Week 2 (15 September) 

The two guest judges on this episode were Bobby Davro and Sally Lindsay. The winner of this heat was Jodie Marsh.

Week 3 (22 September) 

The two guest judges on this episode were Lucy Benjamin and Christopher Biggins. The winner of this heat was Roy Walker.

Week 4 (29 September) 

The two guest judges on this episode were Bonnie Langford and Freddie Starr. The winner of this heat was Henry Olonga.

Week 5 (6 October) 

The two guest judges on this episode were Peter André and Vanessa Feltz. The winner of this heat was Toby Anstis.

Week 6: Final (13 October) 

The two guest judges on this episode were Jo Brand and David Gest.

The winner of the series was Henry Olonga.

External links

Channel 5 (British TV channel) reality television shows
2000s British reality television series
2006 British television series debuts
2006 British television series endings
Talent shows
Celebrity reality television series
Celebrity competitions
English-language television shows